The 26th congressional district of Illinois was a congressional district for the United States House of Representatives in Illinois. The district was created in 1949 and was eliminated as a result of the 1950 Census. Its only representative was C. W. Bishop who was redistricted from and into the 25th district.

List of members representing the district

Electoral history

1948 – 1950

References 

 Congressional Biographical Directory of the United States 1774–present

Former congressional districts of the United States
26
1949 establishments in Illinois
Constituencies established in 1949
1953 disestablishments in Illinois
Constituencies disestablished in 1953